Blackbird Bay is a bay located on Otsego Lake. It is located in the Village of Cooperstown in the U.S. state of New York. The historic Otesaga Hotel is located on the shore as well as the Leatherstocking Golf Course.

Appearances in literature
In The Pioneers, the point on the northern shore of Blackbird Bay is the site of an annual bass fishing expedition. Residents of the Village of Cooperstown then used nets to catch 1,000 Otsego bass, as well as other fish species in the lake in chapter 23. It is also the location where Natty Bumppo rescues the sailor Ben Pump from drowning in chapter 24.

References

Landforms of Otsego County, New York